Proline-rich proteins (PRPs) is a class of intrinsically unstructured proteins (IUP) containing several repeats of a short proline-rich sequence. 

Many tannin-consuming animals secrete a tannin-binding protein (mucin) in their saliva. Tannin-binding capacity of salivary mucin is directly related to its proline content. Advantages in using salivary proline-rich proteins (PRPs) to inactivate tannins are :
 PRPs inactivate tannins to a greater extent than do dietary proteins; this results in reduced fecal nitrogen losses,
 PRPs contain non specific nitrogen and nonessential amino acids; this makes them more convenient for an animal to exploit rather than using up valuable dietary protein.

Example of this class of protein is IB5, a human parotid salivary protein known to bind with polyphenols (binding responsible for the astringency mouth feel). Other examples include Proline-Rich 12, Proline-Rich Protein 30, and Proline-Rich Protein 21.

References